In statistics, the inverse Wishart distribution, also called the inverted Wishart distribution, is a probability distribution defined on real-valued positive-definite matrices.  In Bayesian statistics it is used as the conjugate prior for the covariance matrix of a 
multivariate normal distribution.

Important identities have been derived for the inverse-Wishart distribution.

Density

The probability density function of the inverse Wishart is:

Theorems

Distribution of the inverse of a Wishart-distributed matrix

Marginal and conditional distributions from an inverse Wishart-distributed matrix

Suppose  has an inverse Wishart distribution. Partition the matrices  and  conformably with each other 
 

 ;
 , where  is a matrix normal distribution;
 , where ;

Conjugate distribution

Suppose we wish to make inference about a covariance matrix  whose prior  has a  distribution.  If the observations  are independent p-variate Gaussian variables drawn from a  distribution, then the conditional distribution   has a  distribution, where .

Because the prior and posterior distributions are the same family, we say the inverse Wishart distribution is conjugate to the multivariate Gaussian.

Due to its conjugacy to the multivariate Gaussian, it is possible to marginalize out (integrate out) the Gaussian's parameter , using the formula  and the linear algebra identity :

 

(this is useful because the variance matrix  is not known in practice, but because  is known a priori, and  can be obtained from the data, the right hand side can be evaluated directly). The inverse-Wishart distribution as a prior can be constructed via existing transferred prior knowledge.

Moments
The following is based on Press, S. J. (1982) "Applied Multivariate Analysis", 2nd ed. (Dover Publications, New York), after reparameterizing the degree of freedom to be consistent with the p.d.f. definition above.

The mean:

The variance of each element of :

The same results are expressed in Kronecker product form by von Rosen as follows:

where

 commutation matrix

To show how the interacting terms become sparse when the covariance is diagonal, let  and introduce some arbitrary parameters :

where  denotes the matrix vectorization operator. Then the second moment matrix becomes

The variances of the Wishart product are also obtained by Cook et al. in the singular case and, by extension, to the full rank case.

Setting  the marginal distribution of the leading diagonal element is thus
 

and by rotating  end-around a similar result applies to all diagonal elements .  

A corresponding result in the complex Wishart case was shown by Brennan and Reed and the uncorrelated inverse complex Wishart  was shown by Shaman to have diagonal statistical structure in which the leading diagonal elements are correlated, while all other element are uncorrelated.

Related distributions 
 A univariate specialization of the inverse-Wishart distribution is the inverse-gamma distribution.

 i.e., the inverse-gamma distribution, where  is the ordinary Gamma function.
 The Inverse Wishart distribution is a special case of the inverse matrix gamma distribution when the shape parameter  and the scale parameter .
 Another generalization has been termed the generalized inverse Wishart distribution, . Note that when  is equal to an identity matrix, . This generalized inverse Wishart distribution has been applied to estimating the distributions of multivariate autoregressive processes.
 A different type of generalization is the normal-inverse-Wishart distribution, essentially the product of a multivariate normal distribution with an inverse Wishart distribution.

The result is known in optimal portfolio statistics, as in Theorem 2 Corollary 1 of Bodnar et al,  where it is expressed in the inverse form  .

See also
Inverse matrix gamma distribution
Matrix normal distribution
Wishart distribution
Complex inverse Wishart distribution

References 

Continuous distributions
Multivariate continuous distributions
Conjugate prior distributions
Exponential family distributions